In physics, mechanics and engineering, an adiabatic shear band is one of the many mechanisms of failure that occur in metals and other materials that are deformed at a high rate in processes such as metal forming, machining and ballistic impact. Adiabatic shear bands are usually very narrow bands, typically 5-500 μm wide and consisting of highly sheared material. Adiabatic is a thermodynamic term meaning an absence of heat transfer – the heat produced is retained in the zone where it is created. (The opposite extreme, where all heat that is produced is conducted away, is isothermal.)

Deformation
It is necessary to include some basics of plastic deformation to understand the link between heat produced and the plastic work done. If we carry out a compression test on a cylindrical specimen to, say, 50% of its original height, the stress of the work material will increase usually significantly with reduction. This is called ‘work hardening’. During work hardening, the micro-structure, distortion of grain structure and the generation and glide of dislocations all occur. The remainder of the plastic work done – which can be as much as 90% of the total, is dissipated as heat.

If the plastic deformation is carried out under dynamic conditions, such as by drop forging, then the plastic deformation is localized more as the forging hammer speed is increased. This also means that the deformed material becomes hotter the higher the speed of the drop hammer. Now as metals become warmer, their resistance to further plastic deformation decreases. From this point we can see that there is a type of cascade effect: as more plastic deformation is absorbed by the metal, more heat is produced, making it easier for the metal to deform further. This is a catastrophic effect which almost inevitably leads to failure.

History
The first person to carry out any reported experimental programme to investigate the heat produced as a result of plastic deformation was Henri Tresca in June 1878  Tresca forged a bar of platinum (as well as many other metals); at the moment of forging the metal had just cooled down below red heat. The subsequent blow of the steam hammer, which left a depression in the bar and lengthened it, also reheated it in the direction of two lines in the form of a letter X. So great was this reheating, the metal along these lines was fully restored for some seconds to red heat. Tresca carried out many forging experiments on different metals. Tresca estimated the amount of plastic work converted into heat from a large number of experiments, and it was always above 70%.

References

Solid mechanics
Deformation (mechanics)